The digital divide is described as the characterization of the gap between individuals or countries that have access to technology and individuals or countries that do not. This also includes, but is not limited to: access to computers, internet, and information literacy. General contributions to the digital divide are geography and next generational users. Next generational users are more involved with using devices that can connect to the internet, while the geography factor focuses more on how an individuals' location put them at an advantage or disadvantage to compete with the digital age. However, only a handful on people and communities are being represented. Underdeveloped geographical locations, like certain regions of the continent of Africa serves as one of the underrepresented minorities. In particular, South Africa faces many developmental problems that make it one of the more complex societies in the world to map the digital divide in. The country is divided by ethnic inequality and discrepancies in the level of development between different sectors. These obstacles result in disparities in access to information and communications technology (ICT). This disparity is commonly known as the digital divide. There has been another major contributor, namely, Telkom and its monopolistic hold on the progress of ICT in South Africa

Telecommunications

South Africa started the development of a local telecommunications industry in 1958. Despite a rather successful state policy for some two decades, the old state policies can no longer keep up with new designs of digital equipment. Many proposals are currently being discussed within the government and the telecommunications industry itself for future development. One attempt to liberalize the communications industry was to end the monopoly of Telkom and open up the sector for market competition. In addition, since the change in technology is so rapid and radical, local firms find themselves increasingly obsolescent in technology because the import and manufacture of digital equipment are expensive and its continual updating is necessary.

Government

The introduction of e-governance such as the implementation of online governmental websites has been proven to be a huge challenge to South Africa. Still, today the South African government impedes progress, many in this industry would agree, the reason they restrict growth in certain areas is simply that they have no understanding of the benefits. According to Kroukamp (2005), political leaders are reluctant to bring changes to the IT policies that are thought to be unnecessary. In many cases, changes are only made to satisfy the needs of the government instead of citizens. In the social context, available websites might not reach everyone, since people speak different mother tongues.

Education

Between 2000 and 2003, there was a growth rate of 59 percent in the number of schools with computers, mainly in secondary schools. Despite a high growth rate, at the national level, 39 percent of schools in South Africa have computers and 26 percent use computers for teaching and learning. It follows that more than half of the schools in South Africa cannot provide students with any computer facility. Statistics have also shown that there is a stark regional disparity in the growth rate of ICT, with Gauteng, Northern Cape and Western Cape far ahead of other provinces. In relation to Research, Africa has made a number of tangible developments which will assist greatly as part of its economic development  

In both primary and secondary schools, basic computer knowledge is being taught. However, there is a disparity in the capabilities of students and teachers to use ICT effectively to integrate technology into teaching and learning.

Internet

According to Internet World statistics, by the end of 2009, 10.8 percent of the entire population in South Africa has access to the Internet.  Having an average Internet speed of about 1 Mbit/s, the country's connection speed is below the 2 Mbit/s Broadband international average. Hence, South Africa's low access rate to the Internet and below average connection speed make it difficult for the country to compete with other countries in attracting foreign investments.  In a study conducted in 2011, they estimate that internet access is only available to roughly fourteen percent of the African population.[14] This means that while the world's population is only composed of fifteen percent of Africans, around six percent of that subscribe to the internet. [15]

See also
 Mobile Literacy in South Africa
 Open access in South Africa to scholarly communication

References

External links
 http://www.ais.up.ac.za/digi/docs/mphidi_paper.pdf
 http://www.cellular.co.za/news_2004/may/0501004-itu_says_africa_is_the_world.htm

South Africa
Communications in South Africa
Society of South Africa